Bienservida is a municipality in the Province of Albacete, Castile-La Mancha, Spain. It has a population of 858.

Municipalities of the Province of Albacete